Tal Shochat (Hebrew: טל שוחט; born 1974) is an Israeli photographer.

Early life
Tal Shochat was born in 1974 in Netanya. She was educated at HaMidrasha School of Art, Beit Berl College from 1995 to 1999.

Career
Shochat takes photographs of fruit trees against cloth backdrops. An article on SFGate.com explained that she " cleaned every branch and leaf before shooting five fruit trees that grow in Israel - peach, almond, pomegranate, apple and persimmon - at their peak of ripeness against a black background." In a review of an exhibit at the V&A, the Financial Times suggested her photographic method was comparable to David Buckland's.

Her artwork is in the permanent collections of the Los Angeles County Museum of Art (LACMA) in Los Angeles, California, United States, and the Victoria and Albert Museum (V&A) in London, United Kingdom. Another artwork was also held at the Art Gallery of the University of Haifa in Israel prior to its disestablishment.

Exhibition History 
Shochat has had numerous solo and group exhibitions, as well as being the recipient of prestigious awards for her work.

One-Person Exhibitions

2017  Lessons in Time, Rosenfeld Gallery, Tel Aviv

2017  Other Days, Petach Tikva Museum of Art

2013  License to Survive, Rosenfeld Gallery, Tel Aviv

2012  In Praise of a Dream, National Museum of American Jewish History, Philadelphia, PA

2011  In a Praise of a Dream, Andrea Meislin Gallery, New York

2008  Sometimes it’s Cold in the Morning, Rosenfeld Gallery, Tel Aviv

2007  Flying Ceiling, Herzliya Museum of Contemporary Art, Israel

2005  Awakening, Andrea Meislin Gallery, New York

2005  Awakening, Rosenfeld Gallery, Tel Aviv

2003  Queen of the Night, Rosenfeld Gallery, Tel Aviv

1999  Marshim series, Haifa Museum of Art

Group Exhibitions

2019  Jacqueline Kahanoff: The Levant as a Parable, MUSA- Eretz Israel Museum, Tel Aviv

2019  Visions of Place: Complex Geographies in Contemporary Israeli Art, Towson

2018  The Desert Shall Rejoice and Blossom: Photographs by Oded Balilty and Tal Shochat, Jewish Federation of

Cleveland

2018  Voyage, Rosenfeld gallery, Tel Aviv

2018  Flood, Ashdod Art Museum

2018  Musée de la Chasse et de la Nature, Paris

2018  Celebrating Israel’s 70th Anniversary: Michal Rovner and Tal Shochat, Nevada Museum of Art

2018  To The End of Land, National Gallery of Modern Art, New Delhi

2017  Into the Wood: Trees in Photography, V&A Museum, London

2017  Home-Mother, Afula’s local city gallery

2016  The Winners: Ministry of Culture and Sport Prizes for 2015, Herzliya Museum of Contemporary Art

2015  Flora Palestina- Photopoetics 5, The New Gallery, Musrara, Jerusalem

2015  Visions of Place: Complex Geographies in contemporary Israeli Art, Stedman gallery

2015  Rutgers – Camden, N.J (traveling exhibition)

2015  The Wandering Jew: an Artistic Reflection, Mane-Katz Museum, Haifa

2015  In Different Place, Electra Tower, Tel Aviv

2015  Islamic Art Now: Contemporary Art of the Middle East, Los Angeles County Museum of Art (LACMA)

2015  SELF: Portraits of Artists in Their Absence, The National Academy. Museum, New York

2014  Neighbors – Photographs from Israel, Tokyo Art Museum, Japan

2014  The Chicago Triangle, Haifa Museum of Art, Israel

2013  Leaving the Land of Roses, Shulamit Gallery, Venice, California

2012  Light from the Middle East: New Photography, Victoria and Albert Museum, London

2012 Do Not Destroy: Trees, Art, and Jewish Thought, Contemporary Jewish Museum, San Francisco

2011  Dignity and Gracefulness, Felix-Nussbaum-Haus/ Kulturgeschichtliches Museum, Osnabrück, Germany

2011  Professionals, Rosenfeld Gallery, Tel Aviv

2010  Family Files, Jewish Museum, Munich, Germany

2010  In Detail: From the Collections of Arnie Druck, Haifa Museum of Art

2009  Passing Summer, P.O.V, The Israeli Photography Festival, Tel Aviv

2009  Four Openings in Israeli Art, Bezalel Gallery, Tel Aviv, Israel

2009  Ethics/ Aesthetics, Artists House, Tel Aviv

2009  Fireflies, CSB, The Curatorial Studies Program Gallery, Tel Aviv

2009  League, 100 years-101 women, 101 women artists, Amiad Center, Jaffa

2009  2009 Tel Aviv Time, Tel Aviv Museum of Art

2008  Good Kids, Rosenfeld Gallery, Tel Aviv

2008  Dead End, Rosenfeld Gallery, Tel Aviv

2008  Stills 07-08, The Art Institute Gallery, Oranim Academic College

2008  Protected Space, The Art Gallery, Kibbutz Nachshon

2008  Access to Israel: Israeli Contemporary Art, Jüdisches Museum, Frankfurt

2008  Personal Landscapes: Contemporary Art from Israel, American University Museum, Washington

2008  Real Time: Art in Israel 1998-2008, The Israel Museum, Jerusalem

2007  The Other Sea, The Artists’ House, Jerusalem

2007  Place Photography II, The New Gallery, Bet Gabriel on the Kinneret

2006  Raw and Cooked, The Art Gallery, University of Haifa

2006  Apropos Les Demoiselles, Petach Tikva Museum of Art

2006  Omanut Haaretz, Reading Power Station Compound, Tel Aviv

2006  Making a Scene, Haifa Museum of Art

2006  Art of Living: Contemporary Photography and Video from the Israel Museum, The Contemporary Jewish

Museum, San Francisco

2006  Far and Away: The Fantasy of Japan in Contemporary Israeli Art, The Israel Museum, Jerusalem

2006  Prizes in Art from the Ministry of Education, Culture and Sport, 2005, The Israel Museum, Jerusalem

2005  Little Red Hood, DotFiftyOne Art Space, Miami

2005  Disrupted Realism, Rosenfeld Gallery, Tel Aviv

2004  Omanut Haaretz, Reading Power Station Compound, Tel Aviv

2004  Love is in the Air: Images of Romantic Love in Contemporary Israeli Art, Time for Art – Israeli Art Center, Tel

Aviv

2003  Every Day, Every Year, The Art Gallery, Memorial Center, Kiryat Tivon, Israel

2003  Flowers, Kav 16 Gallery, Tel Aviv

2002  Mother Tongue, Museum of Art, Ein Harod, Israel

2001  Sense of Wonder, Herzliya Museum of Art

2001  Alon Segev Gallery, Tel Aviv

2000  Ladies and Gentlemen, Tel Aviv Museum of Art

2000  Arie Aroch, Pe’er Gallery, Tel Aviv

2000  Graduates at Rosenfeld, Rosenfeld Gallery, Tel Aviv

1999  Regarding Raffi, Nofar Gallery, Tel Aviv

1999  Graduates’ Exhibition, The Open Museum of Photography, Tel Hai Industrial Park, Israel

Scholarships and Awards 
2015   The Minister of Culture and Sport’s Visual Art Award, Israel

2005  Prize for a Young Artist, The Israeli Ministry of Education, Culture and Sport

Selected Collections 
The Victoria and Albert Museum, London, England

The Israel Museum, Jerusalem

Haifa Museum of Art Collection

The Doron Sebbag Art Collection, ORS Ltd., Tel Aviv

Shalom Shpilman Collection

IDB Collection

Judah L. Magnes Museum, Berkeley, California

Los Angeles County Museum of Art (LACMA), Los Angeles, California

References

Living people
1974 births
People from Netanya
People from Tel Aviv
Israeli artists
Israeli photographers
Israeli women photographers